Salix acutifolia, also known as Siberian violet-willow, long-leaved violet willow or sharp-leaf willow, is a species of flowering plant in the family Salicaceae, native to Russia and eastern Asia. The young shoots are deep purple with a white bloom. The catkins are produced in early spring, before the leaves. Older bark has a fine, netted pattern.

Like all willows this species is dioecious.

The specific epithet acutifolia means "sharp-leaved".

The male clone 'Blue Streak' has gained the Royal Horticultural Society's Award of Garden Merit.

References

External links
 
 
 

acutifolia
Flora of Ukraine